Beatrice is an unincorporated community in Ritchie County, West Virginia, United States. Its post office closed in 1967.

The community was named after Beatrice Haught, a relative of an early settler.

References 

Unincorporated communities in West Virginia
Unincorporated communities in Ritchie County, West Virginia